Jorge Luis Sierra Cruz (born 8 September 1961 – died 27 October 2014) was a Cuban politician. He was the Cuban Minister of Transportation (since 20 October 2006), the Member of the Political Bureau of the Communist Party of Cuba and the Member of the Executive Committee of CPC. He was a Cuban Vice President since 19 February 2009 till 3 May 2010. He is also a deputy in  National Assembly of People's Power. He died after complications from knee surgery, followed by a massive heart attack.

External links
 fas.org
 cubagob.cu

Members of the National Assembly of People's Power
1961 births
2014 deaths
Transport ministers of Cuba
Communist Party of Cuba politicians